Aleksandar Matić (born 26 April 1978), better known as Saša Matić is a Bosnian Serb pop-folk singer.

Life and career

Early life
Matić was born on 26 April 1978 in Bihać, SFR Yugoslavia. He has a twin brother, Dejan, who is also a well-known singer. They were born prematurely and subsequently became completely blind due to unexplained circumstances. Matić initially grew up in Drvar, before moving to Belgrade with his family.

During his childhood, he learnt to play piano and accordion. Matić graduated from the Zemun Gymnasium and the Music High School 'Kosta Manojlović'. He has cited Croatian singer-songwriter Oliver Dragojević as his musical influence.

Career
Matić made his recording debut in 2001 with the album Prokleta je violina, which was released under Grand Production. He has released ten studio albums. Matić has collaborated with various regional singers, including Ceca, Severina, Jelena Karleuša, Aca Lukas, Mile Kitić, Jelena Rozga and Milica Pavlović.

Since March 2016, Matić has held several sold-out solo concerts at the Belgrade Arena. He has also had regional, as well as international tours in the United States, Canada and Australia. In 2023, it was reported that Matić was the highest attended live act in 2022, Croatia with his four concerts at the Arena Zagreb and Spaladium Arena, which were collectively attended by 80,000 people.

Persona life
Matić is married to Anđelija, with whom he has two daughters.

Discography
Studio albums
Prokleta je violina (2001)
Otišao, vratio se (2002)
Zbogom ljubavi (2003)
Anđeo čuvar (2005)
Saša Matić (2007)
Nezaboravne... (2010)
X zajedno (2011)
Zabranjena ljubav (2015)
Ne bih ništa menjao (2017)
Dva života (2021)

Music festivals
 Music Festival Budva (2003) - "Moj grad" (1st Place)
 Ohrid Fest (2003) - "Moj grad" (Jury Vote Winner)
 Grand Festival (2006) - "Sve je na prodaju" (1st Place)
 Grand Festival (2010) - "Nije ljubav trag na hartiji" (Jury Vote Winner)
 Radijski festival (2013) - "Nađi novu ljubav"

Awards and nominations

See also 
Music of Serbia
Turbo-folk
Dejan Matic

References

External links

Official Site

Serbian turbo-folk singers
Serbian folk-pop singers
21st-century Serbian male singers
Singers from Belgrade
People from Drvar
Serbs of Bosnia and Herzegovina
Bosnia and Herzegovina twins
Blind musicians
Grand Production artists
1978 births
Living people